The following is a list of football stadiums in Saint Pierre and Miquelon, ordered by capacity. There are four outdoor football pitches and one futsal hall. There are currently plans to construct a new national stadium with artificial turf as part of Saint Pierre and Miquelon's application to join CONCACAF.

List

See also 
 List of North American stadiums by capacity
 List of association football stadiums by capacity

References

External links
RSSSF list

 
Stadiums
Football stadiums
France